FC Bunyodkor is a football club based in Tashkent that competes in Uzbek Professional Football League,  the top football league in Uzbekistan, since season 2007. The club was founded in 2005 and played at the beginning in regional Tashkent liga, after that club qualified 2006 to Uzbekistan First League.  
Bunyodkor set some various records in winning various official competitions since its foundation and appearance in Top Uzbek League.

Honours

Domestic

League
 Uzbek League: 5
 2008, 2009, 2010, 2011, 2013
 Uzbek League runner-up: 1
 2012
 Uzbekistan First League: 1
 2006

Cups
 Uzbek Cup: 4
 2008, 2010, 2012, 2013
 Uzbekistan Super Cup: 1
 2014

Doubles
 Uzbek League and Uzbek Cup doubles: 3
 2008, 2010, 2013

Asian
 AFC Champions League semifinal: 2
 2008, 2012

Awards

Club Player of the Year
This award is organized by club and winner is defined by votes via club's official website.

Fair Play
The yearly award given by UFF.

Player records

Most appearances
See also List of FC Bunyodkor former players

This is a list of players with the most officials appearances for the club in all competitions. Players whose name is listed in bold are currently playing for club.

Statistics correct as of 5 December 2017.

Goalscorers

General goalscorers records
 Most goals scored in all official competitions: 65 – Anvar Soliev, 2008–2013
 Most goals scored in one season in all official competitions: 27 – Oleksandr Pyschur, 2013
 Most goals scored in one season Uzbek League: 20 – Rivaldo, 2009
 Most goals scored in one Uzbek Cup: 7 – Stevica Ristic, 2010
 Most goals scored in Tashkent derby: 4 – Shavkat Salomov, 2007–2012
 Most goals scored in AFC Champions League: 8 – Anvarjon Soliev, 2008-2012
 Most goals scored in one season AFC Champions League: 5 – Denilson, 2010

All time topscorers
This is list of club topscorers in all competitions. Names in bold indicate players currently playing in the club.

Season 2007
Goals scored only in League matches

Ilhom Mo'minjonov scored 16 goals for Bunyodkor of 21 and 5 goals for Lokomotiv Tashkent.

Season 2008

Season 2009

Season 2010

Season 2011

Season 2012

Season 2013

Season 2014

Season 2015

Award winners
Uzbekistan Footballer of the Year
The following players have won the Footballer of the Year award while playing for Bunyodkor:
 Server Djeparov – 2008, 2010

Uzbek League Top Scorer
The following players have won the Uzbek League Top Scorer while playing for Bunyodkor:
 Ilhom Mo'minjonov (21 goals)  – 2007
 Server Djeparov (19 goals)  – 2008
 Rivaldo (20 goals)  – 2009
 Miloš Trifunović (17 goals)  – 2011
 Oleksandr Pyschur (19 goals)  – 2013

Team records

Uzbek League

Points

Most points in a season

86 points (in three points for a win system) or 95,55%, becoming the Uzbek team with most points in a 30 game season in the 2009 season, 28 wins and 2 draws.

Note: 1992-1994 Uzbek league seasons was 2 point system for a win.

Wins
Most consequent wins

In the season 2008 Bunyodkor made a new record by winning 22 matches in the row. Previous record belongs to MHSK Tashkent with 20 consequent wins in the season.

Goals
Best goal difference in the season

With +72 goal difference in season 2009 Bunyodkor repeated record of Pakhtakor of the season 2007.

IFFHS World Club Ranking
FC Bunyodkor is listed in Top 400 club by IFFHS. Actually the highest ranking of the club was reached in November 2008, the club ranked at 51st position.

In the newest annual list of  Top 400 club of 2011 published on January 13, 2012, Bunyodkor finished at 205th position.Last updated list: 1 January 2011 - 31 December 2011'''

References

FC Bunyodkor